Åke Ronnie Adolfsson (born 25 March 1956) is a Swedish biathlete. He competed in the 1980 and 1984 Winter Olympics.

References

1956 births
Living people
Biathletes at the 1980 Winter Olympics
Biathletes at the 1984 Winter Olympics
Swedish male biathletes
Olympic biathletes of Sweden
20th-century Swedish people